In music, a blind octave is the alternate doubling above and below a successive scale or trill notes: "the passage being played...alternately in the higher and lower octave." According to Grove's Dictionary of Music and Musicians, the device is not to be introduced into the works of "older composers" (presumably those preceding Liszt).

Alternately, a blind octave may occur "in a rapid octave passage when one note of each alternate octave is omitted." The effect is to simulate octave doubling using a solo instrument.

References

Voicing (music)
Musical terminology